Liberal Fascism: The Secret History of the American Left,  from Mussolini to the Politics of Meaning is a book by Jonah Goldberg, a syndicated columnist and an editor of the online opinion and news publication The Dispatch. In contrast to the mainstream view among historians and political scientists that fascism is a far-right ideology, Goldberg argues in the book that fascist movements were and are left-wing. Published in January 2008, it reached number one on The New York Times Best Seller list of hardcover non-fiction in its seventh week on the list.

Origin of title 
Goldberg has said in interviews that the title Liberal Fascism was taken from a 1932 speech by science fiction pioneer H. G. Wells at Oxford. Before being published, alternative subtitles included The Totalitarian Temptation from Mussolini to Hillary Clinton and The Totalitarian Temptation from Hegel to Whole Foods.

Reception 
In January 2010, the History News Network published essays by David Neiwert, Robert Paxton, Roger Griffin, Matthew Feldman, Chip Berlet and Michael Ledeen criticizing Liberal Fascism. These reviews denounced the book as being "poor scholarship", "propaganda", and not scholarly. History News Network also published a response by Goldberg, which several authors then responded to.

See also 
 Fascism in North America

Notes

External links 
 Book discussion blog on National Review Online
 BookBites - Quotes from the book
 'The Daily Show' Interview with Jonah Goldberg
 What 'The Daily Show' Cut Out by Jonah Goldberg
 Dr. Milt Rosenberg interviews Jonah Goldberg on WGN Radio - Extension 720
 Hugh Hewitt's Interview with Jonah Goldberg 
 Investor's Business Daily's interview with Jonah Goldberg
 
 Robert Wright's interview with Jonah Goldberg on Bloggingheads.tv.

2008 non-fiction books
American political books
Books about politics of the United States
Books about fascism
Books critical of modern liberalism in the United States
Doubleday (publisher) books